The term mass media refers to any means or technology used to communicate a message to large groups of people. Popular forms of mass media include television, the Internet, and newspapers. Mass media are specifically intended to reach larger audiences. The term is often divided into two broad categories: that of electronic mass media and that of print mass media. Electronic mass media require their audiences to interact with electronics in order to receive the message. They attempt to recreate or represent a message through moving pictures and/or sound. Four common examples of electronic media used in Canadian society are television, radio, films, and the Internet. Print mass media, on the other hand, refers to any media that is distributed to audiences in a printed form, on paper. Examples of this include newspapers, printed books, and magazines. 

The mass media model in Canada is different from the mass media model of the United States as well as the rest of the world. According to John A. Irving, mass media functions differently in Canadian society because of a lack of collective identity; this is in reference to Canada's languages (and related cultures) as well as its proximity to the United States. Irving states that such cultural dualism means that only some of the population responds to the mass media in English, while the other portion remain uninfluenced by English-based media. In terms of the proximity to the United States, he explains that "most of the difficulties that threaten the mass media in Canada are the direct outcome of American economic and cultural imperialism." Because of the United States' overwhelming influence on Canadian mass media, Canada has not been able to form its own identity in the media. These two factors have slowed down the process of the creation of a Canadian community. Mass media help in forming a community through communication. When a large group of people is in communication with one another through media, an identifiable culture is formed. Individuals in dialectic experience a sense of membership and collective identity.

Nowadays, certain forms of mass media in Canada are thriving, while others are on the decline. This can be observed through an analysis of the effectiveness of various forms of electronic and print media in Canadian society.

Identity and Mass Media in Canada
As mentioned previously, the existence of two major cultural traditions has impeded the creation of a genuine Canadian community and identity. According to Irving, none of the mass media in Canada have succeeded in establishing any genuine communication between the two cultures. A creative culture exists in Quebec for French Canadians, but English Canadians (that is, those who are not exposed to French culture) are hardly aware of it. The published works of French Canadian authors remain relatively unknown in nine of the ten provinces and have little influence outside of Quebec. In addition to this, the Canadian Broadcasting Corporation operates two separate networks for radio and television; listeners and watchers of the English stations rarely listen to the French stations, and vice versa.

Irving claims that the most important problem facing Canada in terms of forming a genuine identity comes from its close proximity to the United States. It is difficult for a bilingual or multilingual country, such as Canada, Switzerland, or Belgium, to be so close to a country with one common language, such as the United States and England, because of the latter's influence on the former. Over ninety percent of the periodicals displayed on newsstands which sell more than 10,000 copies a month are American. Because of this overwhelming influence of the powerful United States, Canada has been significantly slowed down in forming its own unique identity.

Irving also mentions a third, less important reason for Canada's inability to form a genuine identity in history: distance and geographical regionalism. There are six distinct regions within the domain of Canada: the Atlantic, Quebec, Ontario, the Prairies, British Columbia, and the northern territories. Because of the large distances between these regions, media could not spread throughout the whole country as effectively in the past. In the time of canoe transportation, this distance was a barrier to communication; with the age of the telegraph-railway, Canada finally began to edge towards becoming a proper, connected nation.

The Mass Media Business Model
Media often consists of a two-sided market model. In such cases, each side of the market is expected to provide a form of benefit to the other in return for the same. It is a mutual system of benefit in which there are two end-users or beneficiaries. A lot of times, mass media works in this way (in Canadian society as well as in any other). For example, television requires the viewer and advertisers to provide mutual network benefits. Printed books require the publisher and author to provide readers with quality work; in return, readers provide feedback and increase the popularity of the book through purchases. A newspaper's advertisers and readers mutually benefit from one another; readers provide business for advertisers while advertisers provide readers with information (since a significant portion of newspapers' funding comes from advertisers). The more successful a newspaper is, the better it gets at providing its readers with a well-rounded accumulation of news. All advertising-based media are two-sided markets. Bob Garfield explains that there are two issues with this model: widespread access to certain content has significantly lowered the amount that consumers are willing to spend on it; the audience becomes fragmented. The second issue is that the rise in available content has lowered the prices that advertisers are willing to pay in order to access a portion of the market.

Special attention must be paid to the importance of advertising, particularly in newspapers. Newspapers typically generate about 70 - 80 percent of their revenue from advertising, while the remainder comes from subscriptions and sales. However, with the recent move to online publishing, there have been problems. Online advertising is not nearly as effective as print advertising, according to Eric Clemons. Although he discusses advertising in relation to newspapers in the United States, similar problems exist in Canada. He claims that Internet advertising will fail for three reasons:

 Consumers do not trust advertising - Messages coming from commercial sources have proven to be considered less credible by audiences and therefore have a less powerful impact. Company sponsored blogs are among the least trusted sources of information on products and services.
 Consumers are not interested in viewing advertisements - They visit websites for the main content and do not want to see things which attempt to distract them from this.
 Consumers do not need advertising - If users need a product or service, they have their own sources on the Internet and prefer to use these as opposed to advertisements on websites which are not solely dedicated to the product or service.

Clemons suggests alternative methods for earning money through the Internet, namely selling content and selling access to virtual communities. However, one might argue that this would not be effective in current society; since content and access has been available for free for as long as the Internet has been around, sudden charges might cause an uproar among users of the Internet. Furthermore, a portion of Internet users may not be able to afford paying for content and access, which will limit the amount of revenue businesses will bring in.

In August 2015, the Canadian Media Guild, the union representing CBC journalists, became a registered third party in order to campaign for increased taxpayer funding of the CBC in the 2015 election. After the Liberal Party of Canada won the election, it increased taxpayer funding of the CBC by $150 million.
In 2017, the federal government announced a five-year $50 million program to help struggling local newspapers. In 2018, it announced $595 million in tax credits to help struggling newspapers and television networks.

The Mass Media Journalism Model
The face of print journalism in Canada is undergoing change. Evening newspapers are no longer popular (one of the only surviving ones is tonight Newspaper), while morning newspapers (including the Toronto Star, The Globe and Mail, the National Post, and free newspapers such as Metro and 24) have survived and continued to bring in an audience. Before the 1970s, The Globe and Mail was one of the few surviving morning papers, while most popular newspapers were distributed in the evening in Toronto. Nowadays, most newspapers have joined The Globe and Mail and are published in the morning.

The newspaper industry in Canada (similar to the newspaper industry in other developed countries including the United States) is controlled by a small number of individual or corporate owners. This is referred to as concentrated ownership. Private or partially private ownership of competitive forms of news media helps to create a great amount of freedom of expression, according to Peter Desbarats. However, it may be argued that even these privately owned media outlets have their own agenda, and have therefore only contributed to a limited amount of freedom of expression. Robert A. Hackett discusses this, as well as the differences between publicly owned and privately owned media outlets. It may also be argued that publicly owned media contribute more to freedom of expression than privately owned media; Simeon Djankov, Caralee McLeish, Tatiana Nenova, and Andrei Schleifer, in a joint Harvard-World Bank study, discuss the advantages and disadvantages of publicly owned media outlets in relation to privately owned media outlets. They write that one of the first principles of media is that it is in the public interest, and it is therefore necessary to have outlets owned by the public. In this way, the public keeps a check on the agenda of publications. If there is too much of a bias, the owners (which in this case consists of the public) react and demand a change through various forms of feedback. In contrast, privately owned outlets only have a limited number of voices to give feedback, and these voices may have their own biased agendas. Two characteristics of electronic journalism in Canada set it apart from print journalism: firstly, broadcasting is a regulated industry (which is important to consider in relation to news sources such as radio and television). This means that in order to start a broadcast station, one must have a licence from the Canadian Radio and Telecommunications Commission. This regulated industry also affects news content because it is constantly being monitored by the agency. Secondly, many radio stations and television stations in Canada are publicly owned. Print journalism has almost always been conducted by private enterprise in Canada, and radio also started as a private enterprise which was subject to regulation by the state. It became a hybrid of private and public broadcasters.

Nowadays, online journalism is on the rise. It provides a new platform for readers to interact instantly with news sources through blog comments and feedback. There are also various multimedia options which are not available with print journalism. For example, videos can be embedded into websites. Alexandre Gamela, a freelance journalist, says that "The print product is pretty much the same as it was 20, 30, 40 years ago, it is not well adapted to these new circumstances, therefore it needs to be re-thought and re-designed." For these reasons, online journalism continues to gain popularity. However, as will be discussed under the section on newspapers, readerships for print newspapers in Canada seems to be steady.

The Digital Democracy Project reports that Canadians both consume and somewhat trust print, broadcast and online media sources. They also consume news from social networks such as Twitter, but they mostly recognize the biased tendencies of people who actively post news on such networks. People with strong political opinions are at risk of becoming misinformed by depending only on news sources that they agree with (primarily social media, but also traditional media).

Electronic Mass Media in Canada
There are four main types of electronic media prevalent in Canadian society, which are explored below. Throughout history, each has seen popularity, and certain ones have seen drops in popularity as well.

The Electronic Age and Marshall McLuhan
In The Gutenberg Galaxy, Marshall McLuhan writes that:

if a new technology extends one or more of our senses outside us into the social world, then new ratios among all of our senses will occur in that particular culture. It is comparable to what happens when a new note is added to a melody. And when the sense ratios alter in any culture then what had appeared lucid before may suddenly become opaque, and what had been vague or opaque will become translucent.

He gives great importance to the introduction of electronic media into the realm of people's everyday lives. According to McLuhan, the introduction of electronic media was one of the main media revolutions. He claims that technology evoked an emotional response from audiences although it technically had no moral bias. Technology in the electronic age shapes an individual's (as well as a society's) self-realization. In other words, McLuhan writes about three major revolutions in his various works and gives great importance to the electronic one. Electronic mass media clearly have a large impact on Canadian society and affect audiences in a variety of ways.

Television
The history of television in Canada begins in Montreal and Toronto, where the first television stations were started in 1952. The Canadian Broadcasting Corporation aired its first broadcast on September 6, 1952 from Montreal's station, CBFT. The program was bilingual. As mentioned by Irving, and supported by Arthur Siegel, modern media such as television and radio have become agents of denationalization because of the spillover of U.S. influence and fragmentation of media within Canada. Siegel implies that because of this, the state of television in Canada (i.e. whether it is healthy or dying) depends on the state of television in the United States.

Television was welcomed when it was first introduced into society. It brought about a change from communication which was previously limited to only audio. If one wanted to view something on a screen, one would have to visit the cinema; the television provided a way of sitting at home and having visual communication as well as entertainment. Nowadays, however, with the introduction of smartphones and the Internet, television is headed towards obsolescence according to Rabab Khan. He writes that because smartphones and computers allow one do what a television and radio combined allow, the need for the latter two media is declining. However, he writes that television allows for a shared experience which computers and smartphones do not allow. Henry Blodget also addresses this issue and claims that because revenue and profits of the television industry are still steadily coming in, people are in denial about its inevitable failure. He states that like the newspaper industry, television is beginning to migrate to the web and investing in digital platforms.

Radio
The first radio broadcast station in Canadian history was WXA in Montreal, later called CINW. The first broadcast was on May 20, 1920. Canada's first national radio network was established by a railway; the national radio was a product of the CNR, a state agency. Through this national radio, its creators saw a way of fostering and promoting immigration, enhancing the image of radio, and supporting the nation through communication with large groups of listeners.

The consensus about radio in Canada as well as in most parts of the world is that it is a dying medium. With innovations such as television and the Internet, which have allowed for audio communication paired with visual, there has been less need for radio. Furthermore, the introduction of personalized and portable listening devices (namely mp3 players) have replaced bulkier radios for many. Whereas Internet advertising revenues have steadily increased over recent years, advertising revenue for radio only increased by about 1.5 percent from 2006 to 2007, and this rate is likely to be even smaller now. However, it is not fair to assume that radio is going to become obsolete in the near future; new forms, including online and satellite radio, have been introduced which provide new benefits for listeners. The fact that the radio industry has been able to hold its ground for so many years after the introduction of television is a testament to its longevity.

Films
According to the Canadian Encyclopedia:

The first Canadian films were produced in the fall of 1897, a year after the first public exhibition of motion pictures on 27 June 1896 in Montréal. They were made by James Freer, a Manitoba farmer, and depicted life on the Prairies. In 1898-99, the Canadian Pacific Railway showed them throughout the UK to promote immigration. They were so successful that the federal government sponsored a second tour by Freer in 1902 and the CPR began directly financing production of immigration films.

According to an article in the Toronto Star, the Canadian film industry has always had problems with creating a popular culture because of the shadow of the United States' film industry. For this reason, Canadian films have failed due to a lack of an export market. Canadian actors frequently relocate to Hollywood to further their careers. Also, unlike radio and television, there is no protection for Canadian content in movie theatres. It is clear that Hollywood movies are a lot more popular in Canada than Canadian-made movies. As a whole, the film industry (Hollywood) continues to make substantial profits in Canada as well as around the world; it can, therefore, be said that the medium is not dying.

Internet
In the 1950s and 1960s, with the creation of computers, is where the history of the Internet begins. In 1969 came the invention of ARPANET, the first network to run on packet-switching technology. These were the first hosts on what would one day become the Internet. The concept of email was first created by Ray Tomlinson in 1971, and this innovation was followed by Project Gutenberg and eBooks. Tim Berners-Lee is considered the inventor of the World Wide Web; he implemented the first successful communication between a HyperText Transfer Protocol client and a server.

Because the Internet allowed users ease of access to information about practically any topic, the medium has seen immense popularity ever since its inception. There has never been a point in its relatively short history (it has only been around for about 40 years) when it has declined in popularity. Of all mass media discussed, it seems to be the least threatened. There are various reasons for this: firstly, the Internet provides for its audiences a compilation of almost everything that other electronic media provide, in one convenient medium (a computer). For example, one can watch television shows, films, and listen to the radio online. There is little need for separate devices when everything is available in one. Secondly, the Internet allows for portability and accessibility of information. One no longer has to go to the library for information or go to a theatre in order to watch a film. Thirdly, most content on the Internet is available for free, which makes it more convenient for users. The foremost priority for the Internet has always been to better communication, and it does provide easy and fast communication through email, chat rooms, and online communities; it is also interactive in these ways. There are, however, disadvantages of this medium which do not exist in other electronic media: potential theft of personal information, spamming, and unwanted explicit content. However, as all of these disadvantages can be blocked through the use of protection software, they are not enough to override its advantages. For this reason, the Internet seems to be a healthy and thriving medium to this day in Canada as well as around the world.

Print Mass Media in Canada
Newspapers, printed books, and magazines are three popular forms of print mass media. Throughout history, each has seen certain levels of popularity in relation to one another and in relation to electronic media. Some have also seen drops in popularity and might be considered dying media, as explored below.

Print Media and Marshall McLuhan
According to McLuhan's dichotomies of hot and cool media, print media occupy mostly a visual space, rather than other senses such as that of hearing (which is involved in media like television). He writes that this makes print media a hot medium, as it provides the reader with complete involvement without considerable stimulus. Because print media are hot media, they involve relatively little interaction from users. McLuhan discussed three main media revolutions, one of them coming about with the invention of the printing press. He explained that with texts being mass-produced there was a new level of immediacy, accessibility, and a subsequent rise in literacy; in manuscript culture, access to texts was limited to a privileged few, whereas in print culture, literature increasingly became a commodity. For this reason, print media was revolutionary at the time. However, with the more recent electronic revolution, the importance of print began to decline, as discussed below.

Newspapers
The first period of Canadian journalism spanned from 1752–1807; the second period spanned from 1807–1858; the third period spanned from 1858–1900; the fourth period spans from the beginning of the twentieth century to current day. The first period consisted of newspapers brought and inserted into Canadian society by colonies in New England. The first was the Halifax Gazette, issued on March 23, 1752. The second period began as settlers arrived from Britain and the United States; newspapers began to gain popularity in the Maritime regions. During the third period, the discovery of gold brought settlers to the Pacific Coast region, and there was a growing interest in domestic affairs. Finally, the twentieth century saw a substantial change in Canadian newspapers. After the two world wars, as well as the industrial developments that followed these wars, the circulation of French and English newspapers in Canada increased to more than 5.7 million in 1989. By the mid-1980s, there were 110 daily newspapers. Nowadays, there are 105.

Although online readership has been on the rise, studies by NADbank show that print readership is "business as usual." Nearly 8 in 10 Canadians read a daily newspaper each week, and print readership continues to grow at about 2 percent each year. However, website readership is growing faster, at a rate of 4 percent. Although print readership is currently larger, website readership is growing at a faster rate, suggesting that a takeover is possible in the future. The baby boomer generation, who are over 50 years old, continue to prefer print to online journalism, while younger adults are more likely to read online newspapers due to easier access and limits on time. Furthermore, paid daily newspapers dominate the market but free dailies are gaining popularity in recent times. Advertisers continue to rely on print newspapers to reach Canadians in their home or work environments. For these reasons, print newspapers as a mass medium do not seem to be dying in Canada. They might not be as healthy as they were without any competition from online sources, but they are holding their own ground, according to Statistics Canada.

Printed Books
As mentioned above, the first incident of printing in Canada came in 1752 with the Halifax Gazette. The history of the printed book is slightly different. In 1761, Anton Heinrich took over John Bushell's printing shop in Halifax. James Rivingston, a member of a family involved with bookselling and stationery in London, advertised a large stock of books and stationery for sale in Halifax. The first printing shop was established in 1764 by William Brown and Thomas Gilmore in Quebec.

There are many who think that with the introduction of the Internet and e-reading, the printed book is on the decline for reasons of practicality; e-readers (such as the Kindle and Kobo) allow one to carry many books at once, are as portable as printed books, and provide instantaneous access to books (as opposed to having to search for printed books in a store). They can also be interactive, containing audio and image components and allowing readers to change font styles to suit their own preference.

Certain people think that despite the introduction of e-books, the printed book is not a dying medium. The death of the book was predicted with the advent of radio, then film, then with television, and more recently with the Internet. Because of its history of perseverance, some people have hope that it will survive despite the e-book's various advantages. More people around the world have access to books in printed form than to computers. Furthermore, it is generally accepted that reading off of a screen for long periods of time is less comfortable in the long run than reading print off of a page. For these reasons, whether or not the printed book is a dying medium in Canada can be debated either way; however, for now it seems that they are surviving and adapting (for example, through the use of more attractive graphics) despite such competition.

Magazines
The first Canadian periodicals were established in Nova Scotia by people from New England. The first Canadian magazine was called Nova Scotia Magazine and Comprehensive Review of Literature, Politics, and News. It was edited by William Cochran and printed by John Howe. Publication began in 1789 and lasted three years. This magazine dealt mostly with affairs concerning the British public, despite its being published at a time of colonization in Canada. After this first publication, most magazines over the next fifty years in Canada only lasted a few years, often only a few months. The first ever bilingual magazine, published in 1792, was entitled Le Magasin de Québec; it was published by Samuel Neilson. Journalist and historian Michel Bibaud published La Bibliothèque Canadienne from 1825 to 1830, and John Lovell published the Literary Garland from 1838 to 1851. These were the most well-known exceptions to the rule that magazines lasted only a few years. In the second half of the nineteenth century, the pace of magazine publishing in Canada picked up significantly. George Desbarats launched Canadian Illustrated News in 1869 and it lasted until 1883. Canadian Illustrated News was closely identified with a new emerging sense of Canadian nationalism, like other magazines of the time. Through the use of many pictures, Desbarats felt that the magazine would instill a sense of pride in readers for their Canadian name and society.

According to David Renard, "Over the next 10 years, the magazine industry will experience deep-rooted change from primarily a print-oriented business to one where digital products will represent the largest share of a smaller periodical industry. We expect digital to be the primary source of revenue for magazines past the 2016-2017 time frame." He claims that although print is not dead, the magazine industry might become obsolete. Although he is referring to periodicals in the United States, similar patterns exist in Canada, since over ninety percent of the most popular periodicals sold in Canada are American. Some say that magazines are evolving rather than dying; they are adapting to new technology by creating online versions. For example, iPad versions of magazines have been created recently. However, this still implies that the printed medium of periodicals is dying while online versions are gaining popularity.

See also

Cinema of Canada
Concentration of media ownership
History of Canadian newspapers
Media of Canada
Media ownership in Canada
Television in Canada

References

Further reading

External links
The Canadian Media
The Real Problem with the Media Business Model
The Canadian Encyclopedia (Communications)
Newspapers Canada
Newspaper Audience Databank

 
Canada
Canada